Hyrrokkin is a female jötunn in Norse mythology. According to 13th-century poet Snorri Sturluson, she launched the largest of all ships at Baldr's funeral after the Æsir gods were unable to budge the vessel.

Hyrrokkin was a relatively important figure in the last decades of paganism in Iceland. She appears to be depicted on one of the DR 284 stone from the Hunnestad Monument near Marsvinsholm, Sweden.

Name 
The Old Norse name Hyrrokkin has been translated as 'fire-withered' or 'fire-steamer'. According to linguist Jan de Vries, it is compound formed with the root hyr- ('fire') attached to hrokkinn ('curly; wrinkle'). Scholar John Lindow has proposed the translation 'fire-smoked', perhaps referring to a dark,  shrivelled appearance.

Attestations

Prose Edda
It is told in Snorri Sturluson's Gylfaginning that at Baldr's funeral his wife Nanna died of grief and was placed alongside him on his pyre, thus joining her husband in Hel. Hringhorni, Baldr's ship, was the largest of all such vessels and was to serve as the god's funeral ship. No one, however, could seem to launch the boat out to sea.

The gods then enlisted the help of Hyrrokkin, who came from Jötunheimr, arriving on a giant wolf with vipers as reins. When she dismounted, Odin summoned four berserkers to look after the animal but they were unable to control it without first rendering it unconscious. With her seismic strength, the giantess rolled the boat into the water. This caused the earth to quake and the rollers to set on fire, which angered Thor. He was about to kill Hyrrokkin with his hammer Mjöllnir, but the other gods insisted that he spare her.

She is also mentioned in a list of troll women by an anonymous skald:
Gjölp, Hyrrokkin,
Hengikepta,
Gneip ok Gnepja,
Geysa, Hála,
Hörn ok Hrúga,
Harðgreip, Forað,
Hryðja, Hveðra
ok Hölgabrúðr.

Skaldic poetry 
The late 10th-century skald Þorbjörn dísarskáld, in two preserved fragments addressed directly to Thor, mentions Hyrrokkin among the jötnar killed by the thunder-god at Baldur's funeral:

The poem Húsdrápa (House-Lay), composed by Úlfr Uggason around 985 AD in western Iceland and partially preserved in the Prose Edda, also appears to refer to Hyrrokkin at Baldr's funeral:
"The very powerful Hild of the mountains [giantess] caused the sea-Sleipnir [ship] to lumber forward, but the wielders of the helmet flames [warriors] of Hropt [Odin] felled her mount."

In popular culture
Hyrokkin is featured in the 2020 video game, Assassin's Creed Valhalla, during the missions taking place in Jötunheimr. The missions being merely vision interpretations of the fictional precursor race, the Isu's history, an equivalence is made to Juno, who was mentioned in Assassin's Creed II but made her first appearance in Assassin's Creed: Brotherhood.

See also
Snake-witch stone, a picture stone depicting a female grasping two snakes

References

References

External links

Gýgjar